Antoni Gołubiew (25 February 1907 in Vilnius – 27 June 1979 in Kraków), nicknames Goa, Jan Karol Wayda, Jerzy Cichocki, was a Polish historian, writer and a Catholic publicist. He was one of the cofounders of the pre World War II biweekly Pax. After the war he wrote for the magazines Znak, Odra, and Tygodnik Powszechny. He was also one of the organizers (together with, among others, Czesław Miłosz) of the poetry group Zagary. He is best known as the author of the four volume historical epic Bolesław Chrobry which was written over the whole lifetime of the author. This epic tells the story of the founding and first years of existence of the Polish state.

References

1907 births
1979 deaths
20th-century Polish historians
Polish male non-fiction writers
Writers from Vilnius
Burials at Salwator Cemetery